The Health Star Rating System (HSR) is an Australian and New Zealand Government initiative that assigns health ratings to packaged foods and beverages.  The purpose for the Health Star Rating is to provide a visual comparison of like for like products, to assist consumers into distinguishing and choosing the healthier options. It was designed to target time-deprived working adults as well as parents and children who were less likely to check how healthy each individual product was, through examination of the nutritional facts label on the back of products.

Ratings scale by half star increments between half a star up to five stars, with the higher the rating, the healthier the product. These scores are determined through the use of the Health Star Rating Calculator, which was created by the federal and state governments in collaboration with leading health industry consumer groups and expert nutritionists. The calculator uses nutritional information such as total sugar, sodium, energy and other variants to obtain a rating for the product. Points are added for "healthy" nutrients such as fibres, proteins and vegetable matter whilst points are deducted for "unhealthy" nutrients; nutrients that have been scientifically linked to chronic health disease, such as fats and sugars. There are two types of HSR logos that companies can add to their packaging, one which simply displays the rating and another which depicts the rating along with some of the key nutritional categories.

The Health Star Rating has received criticism over the effectiveness of the calculator and how some companies have potentially manipulated its use. The system has undergone consistent internal monitoring including a two-year review and is currently undertaking a five-year review. An early preview of the five-year report was made available for public viewing from February 2019. The Australian Government has stated that it has closely followed external input and advice from independent journals and papers to continually improve on the system and resolve problems as they arise.

History 
In 2009, the Australia and New Zealand Food Regulation Ministerial Council commissioned former Australian Health Minister Neal Blewett to lead a review on food labelling policy. The review, which was released in 2011, recommended a front of pack labelling system based on a nutrition policy. Following approval of the front of pack labelling system by the council, a group composed of food manufacturing and retail industry, government, public health and consumer representatives was assembled to implement the system. The group agreed on using star ratings at its first meeting.

The Health Star Rating System was introduced in June 2014 on a voluntary basis in Australia and New Zealand. The rating was free to use for any applicable products as long as due process was followed and the correct rating was displayed. A two-year review was scheduled to view uptake and consumer approval rates with a more in depth review to take place after five years.

In June 2016 the HSR Advisory Committee approved a formal two-year progress review to begin. The review was finalised in April 2017. The Advisory Committee agreed that the review should investigate the impact and status of the social marketing campaigns, summaries of anomaly cases and disputes, government arrangement alterations and suggested activities that might enhance the effectiveness of the system and continue to support its growth.

The National Heart Foundation of Australia was asked to report on the data it had collected over this time and present it as part of the review. The Heart Foundation's data focused on three key categories, the uptake and implementation of the HSR in conjunction with the appropriate style guides, how informed consumers were of the initiative and their ability to understand it and the statistical averages of the nutrient status for products that had opted into using the HSR label. Additionally, Isentia, a media intelligence company, was tasked with creating a report on the media impact over the two-year period.

In April 2016 the HSR Advisory Committee begun planning the forthcoming five-year review and in September 2016 the Technical Advisory Group (TCG) was created to review and analyse the overall performance of the HSR Calculator. Independent outside consultants have consistently been approached for HSR reviews, to provide a more balanced and less biased view point. Matthews Pegg Consulting (mpconsulting) was appointed the job of reviewing the HSR and providing feedback on potential areas of improvements in July 2017. Since the review started the consulting group has reviewed 483 public submissions, facilitated public forums all across the country and in January 2018, they released a consultation paper discussing potential enhancements for the HSR Calculator. Three proposed test calculators are currently available to try on the Australian Government Consultation Hub web page.

The Australian Government has run a number of media campaigns between 2014 and February 2019 to further educate consumers and promote the use of the system. Posters, radio advertisements, TV advertisements and YouTube videos have all been created to assist in growing the system by providing further information in an educating manner to all potential consumers. In February 2019 the latest phase of the media campaign was released, with an emphasis on targeting visual media platforms.

Partners 
The Health Star Rating was designed and created through the collaborative efforts of multiple organisations. Whilst funded by the Australian Government these external groups assisted in the creation process helping with the aesthetic design, the public consumer marketing, the implementation process and style guides.

 Australian Beverages Council
 Australian Chronic Disease Prevention Alliance
 Australian Food and Grocery Council
 Australian Industry Group
 Australian Medical Association
 CHOICE
 Obesity Policy Coalition
 Public Health Association of Australia

Calculating the Star Rating 
The Health Star Rating is a star rating system which works on half-star increments. A calculator was created so that each valid product could input their key nutritional values into the calculator and a star rating would be determined. The calculator works via an algorithm that was developed through the consultation of a variety of nutritional and technical experts along with Food Standards Australia New Zealand. The producers of the product applying the Star Rating are responsible for using the correct information and displaying the appropriate star score.

The calculator is available in two formats—an online forum and a Microsoft Excel spreadsheet. Both of these calculators are available for use on the official Health Star Rating website and is accessible to anyone. The Guide for Industry for the Health Star Rating Calculator outlines the steps required in evaluating a products score.

Before inputting the standard nutritional data, the calculator requires a food category to be selected. There are three categories to select from, with the addition of sub-categories for Dairy products (D); Category 1 is for non-dairy beverages, Category 2 is for all foods other than those included in other categories, and category 3 is for oils and spreads. The key difference in calculating a score for a dairy product as compared to a non-dairy is the addition of calcium content.

The second step is to input the product's values for protein, fats, saturated fats, energy, carbohydrates, sugars and sodium. All numbers for nutritional composition is based upon per 100 mL or 100 g as displayed on any Nutrition Information Panel. These nutritional elements are those typically linked with chronic health disease and are called "risk factors". A baseline nutrient score will be calculated based upon the inputs provided with points 'earned' based upon where they lie on the industry guideline tables.

The calculator then takes into account health-beneficial ingredients, including fruits, vegetables, nuts, legumes (FVNL) and a variety of more niche contents. This is called the (FVNL) content and is the percentile sum of these ingredients in the product. Protein and fibre values are also added in this section. This will provide the product with its modifying points. The total for modifying points is subtracted from the baseline nutrient points to provide a final score for the product.

The final step is to use the Health Star Rating table, which displays what rating a product will receive based upon its final score and the food category it belongs to.

Example 
One participating product of the HSR is Sanitarium's Weet-Bix Blends Multi-Grain. It displays a 4 star health rating. By using the values provided on the Nutritional Information Label which can be found on the products packaging, the HSR Calculator can then be used to verify this score. Using this information, we can see an example of how the HSR Calculator functions. The tables used to calculate the points earned; are outlined in the Guide for Industry to the Health Star Rating Calculator and can be found on the official webpage .

After inputting the nutritional values found on the back of the product a baseline score of 9 is calculated. This table is what appears when using the HSR Calculator.

After adding the "healthy" nutrient values, a modifying points score is received. By subtracting the Modifying Points (15) from the Baseline Points (9), a final HSR score of -6 is acquired. As Weet-Bix is a non-dairy breakfast cereal, it falls under category 2. The Final Score Table shows that a score between -6 and -2 for category 2 products is a Health Star Rating of 4 stars, which is correctly displayed on the product. This illustrates an example of how companies use the calculator to find the correct Health Star Rating to display on their products.

Uptake 

Due to the voluntary nature of the Health Star Rating, the industry uptake has been closely monitored since its inception. A study conducted in 2017 from the Nutrients journal found that 4348 out of 15,767 (28%) eligible products were displaying the HSR logo. Major retailers Woolworths, Coles and Aldi were the source of the vast majority of participating products. The results displayed that uptake was on the rise since the inception of the system. The study found that participating products had a higher average HSR as compared to non-participating eligible products. The study surmised that this was due to companies using the HSR as a marketing tool or avoiding the system if it displayed a poor rating for their products. With the exception of Coles, Woolworths and Arnott's, manufacturers were on average displaying the logo on their higher scoring products. Woolworths has strongly supported the initiative and has committed to applying the HSR to all Woolworths branded items.

As of March 2018, the uptake had drastically increased with 10,300 products from more than 160 companies displaying the HSR logo. The National Heart Foundation of Australia has continued to monitor and provide reports on the uptake and compliance and found that 92% of the participating products were displaying the correct score, and that the majority of those that were incorrect were actually understating their Health Star Ratings. Since the inception of the HSR, there has been an increase in the number of participating products every year.

Controversies

Nestle's Milo case 
The Health Star Rating has received criticism for some of the ratings applied to certain products. One such case was with Nestle's Milo, which received a rating of 4.5 stars. Some people took issue with this as they stated that it was a misleading score, where it was ambiguously determined that the rating was based upon 200 mL of skim milk being added for every three teaspoons of Milo. Public health groups found this to be a method of bypassing the system in order to obtain favourable scores for products which may actually be unhealthy.

This particular issue was eventually rectified in 2018 with Nestle removing Milo from the HSR. Nestle maintained the status that they had been compliant with food regulation standards but did not wish to confuse consumers. Some groups including CHOICE, an Australian Consumer campaigning group, have said that Nestle should reinstate the HSR but with the re-adjudicated score of 1.5 stars.

Ratings' accuracy 
Due to the voluntary nature of the system, there has been discussion that some companies are using this to their advantage by adding the logo only to their higher-rating products. Professor Mark Lawrence of Deakin University whose research focuses on public health nutrition, had this to say on the matter. "You can pick and choose. If it suits your interest, you would put the stars on. But if it doesn't then you can fly under the radar." This has led for some to call on the Health Star Rating to be mandatory across all applicable items, to avoid potential distortion of the system. The Australian Government did not rule out the possibility of introducing a mandatory policy in the future during its initial release but consumer groups are still concerned that the system is performing below its capabilities until this occurs.

The Health Star Rating Calculator has been questioned in its application of sugar in the equation used to create a rating score. Currently, the calculator simply adds the total amount of sugar contained in an individual product but a Journal of the Academy of Nutrition and Dietetics article discussed the possibility of distinguishing natural sugars and added sugars when determining HSR scores. It was found that when the scores were recalculated under the proposed method, approximately 7.3% of products received a score of under 3.5 stars compared to the traditional method where the products score was over 3.5 stars. Nutrition Australia, an independent health organisation, has been campaigning for greater scope when calculating the scores, particularly where dairy and naturally higher occurring fat products are involved such as avocados. The CEO of the Victorian Division had this to say on the topic. "It's imperative that the Health Star Rating makes changes now, to score foods and drinks better so that everyday Aussies can confidently select nutritious options from the five core food groups, and avoid sneaky and misleading unhealthy options." Milk is an example of one such product which contains high levels of natural sugars (lactose) but is considered a core part of a healthy diet. These discrepancies have caused controversy in how the HSR calculates its scores for certain products.

See also 

 Healthcare in Australia
Healthcare in New Zealand
 Food and Nutrition Service
 List of food labeling regulations

References

External links 

 
List of New Zealand companies using the HSR

Food labelling
Food law
Food packaging
Healthcare in Australia
Rating systems